Atanasio Girardot Sports Complex (officially Unidad Deportiva Atanasio Girardot) is a sports complex located in Medellín, Colombia. The complex includes Estadio Atanasio Girardot, Medellín Sports Coliseum, Luis Alberto Villegas Stadium, and Alfonso Galvis Duque Stadium.

Atanasio Girardot Stadium 
Estadio Atanasio Girardot (Atanasio Girardot Stadium) is currently used mostly for football matches by two teams, Atlético Nacional and Independiente Medellín, two of the most successful and popular football clubs from Colombia. The stadium was built in 1953 and was renovated for the 2011 FIFA U-20 World Cup to its current capacity of 40,943. It is also the third largest stadium in the country behind  Estadio Deportivo Cali and Estadio Metropolitano Roberto Meléndez. The stadium was named after Atanasio Girardot, a Colombian revolutionary leader who fought alongside Simón Bolívar.

Concerts

Medellín Sports Coliseum

Medellin Sports Coliseum is a complex of five sports arenas: the Guillermo Gaviria Correa Coliseum for Martial Arts, the Jorge Valderrama Coliseum for Handball, the Jorge Hugo Giraldo Coliseum for Gymnastics, the Iván de Beodut Coliseum for Basketball, and the Yesid Santos Coliseum for Volleyball. The five gymnasiums were designed by Giancarlo Mazzanti and Plan B Architects. Three coliseums were renovated and two new coliseums were constructed in 18 months and with CO$50 million in preparation for the 2010 South American Games. The coliseum was built with wavy, sloped green roofs, and has an area of 493,000 square feet.

Sporting events held 

The stadium has hosted many sporting events:
 2001 Copa América
 2010 South American Games
 2011 FIFA U-20 World Cup

Transport 
The complex has its own station on line B of the Medellín Metro, which is named Estadio.

See also 
 Medellín Sports Coliseum

References 

Atlético Nacional
Independiente Medellín
Sports venues completed in 1953
Atanasio Girardot
Copa América stadiums
Sport in Medellín
Multi-purpose stadiums in Colombia
Athletics (track and field) venues in Colombia
Buildings and structures in Medellín
1953 establishments in Colombia